Alexandru Daniel Jipa (born 14 September 2002) is a Romanian professional footballer who plays as an midfielder for Liga I side Chindia Târgoviște.

References

External links
 

2001 births
Living people
Sportspeople from Târgoviște
Romanian footballers
Association football midfielders
Liga I players
AFC Chindia Târgoviște players